Navarro Networks, Inc., was a developer of Ethernet-based ASIC components based in Plano, Texas, in the United States.  They produced a network processor for Ethernet and other applications.

Navarro Networks was founded in 2000.  Their CEO was Mark Bluhm, who was formerly a vice president at Cyrix.  A group of nine employees left the Cyrix division of Via on March 21, 2000 to staff the company. The employee walkout had occurred just a day after Via announced that they would be spinning off the Cyrix division as a separate company.

Cisco Systems announced their intent to acquire Navarro Networks in May 1, 2002; on the same day, Cisco also announced their bid to acquire Hammerhead Networks. The acquisition was completed in June that year, with Cisco dealing Navarro a stock swap worth $85 million. Most of the 25 employees of Navarro joined the Internet Systems Business Unit to enhance Cisco's internal ASIC capability in Ethernet switching platforms.

References

External links
 

2000 establishments in Texas
2002 disestablishments in Texas
American companies established in 2000
American companies disestablished in 2002
Cisco Systems acquisitions
Computer companies established in 2000
Computer companies disestablished in 2002
Defunct computer companies of the United States
Defunct networking companies
Networking hardware companies